The People's Princess was a radio play written by Shelagh Stephenson. Directed in Belfast by Eoin O'Callaghan, it premiered as the Afternoon Play on 11 December 2008 at 2.15pm on BBC Radio 4. It was based around the marriage and divorce of George IV and Caroline of Brunswick. As the title suggests, it drew parallels with the marriage and divorce of Prince Charles and Diana, such as Caroline and Diana's popularity among the British working classes, Charles and George's unpopularity during their divorce proceedings, the fickleness of such popularity or unpopularity, Caroline and Diana's use by anti-monarchical figures for their own ends, and the power of the press.

Cast
George IV - Alex Jennings
Caroline of Brunswick - Rebecca Saire
Henry Brougham - Julian Rhind Tutt
Lord Sidmouth - Chris McHallem
Lord Liverpool - Richard Howard
Sir Robert Gifford - Mark Lambert
Lady Jersey - Jill Cardo
Mr Majoucci - Nial Cusack

Offstage characters include the Duke of Wellington, Caroline's dead daughter Princess Charlotte Augusta of Wales, William Wood, William Cobbett and Caroline's lover Mr Pergami.

References

External links
http://www.bbc.co.uk/programmes/b00ft64r

2008 audio plays
British radio dramas
Cultural depictions of George IV
Caroline of Brunswick